Judy Reynolds (born 11 June 1981 in Kildare, Ireland) is an Irish Olympic dressage rider. Representing Ireland, she participated at the 2016 Summer Olympics in Rio de Janeiro, Brazil, where she achieved 18th place in the individual competition.

Reynolds also competed at four World Equestrian Games (in 2006, 2010, 2014 and 2018) and at four European Championships (in 2007, 2011, 2015 and 2019). Her current best championship results were achieved in 2019, when she placed 5th in both special and freestyle competitions.

Reynolds participated at three editions of World Cup Finals (in 2016, 2017 and 2019). Her best result came at the 2017 Finals held in Omaha, Nebraska, where she placed 4th.

She was named the Irish Dressage Rider of the Year in 2008, 2014, 2015, 2016, 2017 and 2018.

Dressage results

Olympic Games

World Championships

European Championships

World Cup

Final

Western European League

Q - denotes qualification for the World Cup Final

Western European League podiums

References

Living people
1981 births
Irish female equestrians
Irish dressage riders
People from County Kildare
Equestrians at the 2016 Summer Olympics
Olympic equestrians of Ireland